Songo  is a town and a municipality in Uíge Province in Angola. The municipality had a population of 61,682 in 2014.

References

Populated places in Uíge Province
Municipalities of Angola